Sir Maurice Alan Edgar Mawby  (31 August 1904 – 4 August 1977) was an Australian mining industry leader.

References

Australian business executives
1904 births
1977 deaths
Fellows of the Australian Academy of Science
Knights Bachelor